Joanna Denny (died 2006) was a historian and author specialising in the court of Henry VIII of England. Her books include Katherine Howard: A Tudor Conspiracy and Anne Boleyn. Her books are usually considered to be sympathetic towards these women. She was published by Portrait Books, an imprint of Piatkus. She is a descendant of Sir Anthony Denny, Henry VIII's trusted servant. She died in 2006, shortly before the publication of her book on Anne Boleyn.

References

Year of birth missing
2006 deaths
British historians
British women historians